National Route 6 (N6) is a  major primary national route that forms part of the Philippine highway network in the provinces of Negros Occidental and Negros Oriental.

History

Route description

Bacolod 

The route starts in a merge from Bacolod South Road and a junction of Negros Occidental Eco Tourism Highway.

Bago to Kabankalan

Kabankalan to Bais 

The route in Bacolod South Road changes from N6 to N712 and continuing the route in the junction of Bais–Kabankalan Road in Kabankalan. It traverses to Mabinay, which the kilometer count changes because of the separated kilometer count among the two provinces and Bais in Negros Oriental. The road finally reaches the southern terminus, ending the route in Dumaguete North Road.

References 

Roads in Negros Occidental
Roads in Negros Oriental